Shmutsige Magnaten (subtitled Coleman Plays Gebirtig) is a live solo album by pianist Anthony Coleman performing the songs of Mordechai Gebirtig recorded in Poland and released on the Tzadik label in 2006.

Reception

In his review for Allmusic, Thom Jurek states "Coleman is a master, and if you're at all interested either in Yiddish music or solo piano recordings that transcend jazz, blues, and other folk forms, let Shmutsige Magnaten be it".

Track listing
All compositions by Mordechai Gebirtig except as indicated
 "Mayn Yovl" – 5:00  
 "Mamenyu an Eytse" – 4:27  
 "Kartofl Zup mit Shvamen" – 8:30  
 "Avreml der Marvikher" – 8:54  
 "Oy Briderl, l'Chaim" – 7:33  
 "S'brent" – 6:00  
 "Hulyet, Hulyet, Kinderlekh" – 2:54  
 "S'Izs Gut" – 4:13  
 "Minuten Fun Betochen/Minuten Fun Yiesh" (Gebirtig, Coleman) – 5:46  
 "Oreme Shnayderlekh" – 8:15

Personnel
Anthony Coleman – piano, vocals

References

Tzadik Records live albums
Anthony Coleman albums
2006 albums